The 1949 VFL Grand Final was an Australian rules football game contested between the Carlton Football Club and Essendon Football Club, held at the Melbourne Cricket Ground on 24 September 1949. It was the 52nd annual grand final of the Victorian Football League, staged to determine the premiers for the 1949 VFL season. The match, attended by 88,718 spectators, was won by Essendon by 73 points, marking that club's ninth premiership victory.

It was Essendon's fourth successive grand final appearance, having won the 1946 VFL Grand Final but finishing runners-up the previous two years. Star Bombers full-forward John Coleman, in his first season of VFL Football, kicked six goals for the game, the last of which brought up his 100th goal for the year.

Teams

Umpire - Jack McMurray

Scorecard

See also
 1949 VFL season

References
1949 Grand final stats page on AFL Tables
 The Official statistical history of the AFL 2004 
 Ross, J. (ed), 100 Years of Australian Football 1897-1996: The Complete Story of the AFL, All the Big Stories, All the Great Pictures, All the Champions, Every AFL Season Reported, Viking, (Ringwood), 1996. 

VFL/AFL Grand Finals
Grand
Essendon Football Club
Carlton Football Club